Nabitan (Nabutam, Benzopyranoperidine, SP-106, Abbott 40656) is a synthetic cannabinoid analog of dronabinol (Marinol). It exhibits antiemetic and analgesic effects, most likely by binding to and activating the CB1 and CB2 cannabinoid receptors, and reduced intraocular pressure in animal tests, making it potentially useful in the treatment of glaucoma.

Nabitan has the advantage of being water-soluble, unlike most cannabinoid derivatives, and was researched for potential use as an analgesic or sedative, although it was never developed for clinical use and is not currently used in medicine, as dronabinol or nabilone were felt to be more useful. However it is sometimes used in research into the potential therapeutic applications of cannabinoids.

References 

Propargyl compounds
Carboxylate esters
Cannabinoids
Benzopyrans
Nitrogen heterocycles
Oxygen heterocycles
Heterocyclic compounds with 3 rings
1-Piperidinyl compounds